Central High School, is a public four-year high school located in Kane County, Illinois, a far northwest suburb of Chicago, Illinois, United States. It is part of Central Community Unit School District 301, which serves Elgin, Lily Lake, Plato Center, Udina, Hampshire, Pingree Grove, Sycamore, Maple Park, Burlington and far western portions of St. Charles.

Academics
In 2015, the Average ACT score was 22.9. In 2021-22, Central High School students saw a six-year high in year-to-year growth in Mathematics by 11% on the SAT, per ISBE. The Class of 2020, widened the gap of percentage of students enrolling in college within 12 months in comparison to the Illinois state average from 15% to 18%, according to ISBE. 82% of Central High School students enrolled in college within 12 months, compared to the rest of Illinois (64%).

Athletics
Central High Schoolis currently a member of the Fox Valley Conference and offers more than 24 sports - including cheerleading, dance, football, soccer, cross-country, basketball, volleyball, wrestling, baseball, track & field, and non-official swimming and hockey teams.

In 2021-22, the boys' basketball team won a school record 31 games and an IHSA Regional Title. Meanwhile the girls' basketball team completed a 4th Place finish in 2014, the highest in school history.

"We Are Central" 

Central 301 was founded in 1948 in the era of consolidation. Leaders at that time chose the name because it was a central location between Burlington High School and Plato Center High School in rural Kane County. As the two districts (along with Lily Lake) worked through the process of consolidation, a new junior / senior high school was constructed along Plato Road and opened to Grades 7-12 in 1957. The building went through several rounds of expansion. It also experienced a devastating fire that destroyed the gym and cafeteria in January 1986. In the coming years as growth continued in the area, voters approved a referendum to construct a new high school adjacent to the building. The current high school opened on "Rocket Hill" in 1991, while the original high school is now Central Middle School.

The name "Burlington" has never been a part of the formal name for either the district or the high school. Students from Elgin, South Elgin, Campton Hills and Pingree Grove encompass an overwhelming majority of the 1,400 students at Central High School. The district uses the "We Are Central" motto as a way to engage students from nearly a dozen communities in Kane County.

References

 http://www.city-data.com/school/central-high-school2-il.html
 http://www.dailyherald.com/sports/20180116/burlington-central-will-join-fox-valley-conference-in-2019-20

External links
 

Public high schools in Illinois
Schools in Kane County, Illinois